The Palmophyllales are a deep-branching order of thalloid green alga, containing the single family Palmophyllaceae. They possibly form a sister group to the Chlorophyta. They survive today in deep waters, where predation pressure is reduced. The group contains the genera Palmophyllum, Verdigellas and Palmoclathrus. The morphology of Palmophyllales is unusual in that they are composed of cells in a gelatinous matrix, so they are multicellular, but not in a conventional way.

Genera
 Palmoclathrus Womersley 1971
 Palmophyllum Kützing 1845 non Conwentz 1886
 Verdigellas Ballantine & Norris 1994

References

Green algae orders
Palmophyllophyceae